Dennis G. Smith is the Director of the Centers for Medicaid and State Operations, an agency in the Health and Human Services Department under President George W. Bush.

Letters
Under the new rule, a state must show that a child has been uninsured for at least one year before being signed up for coverage. In addition, the state must demonstrate that at least 95 percent of children in that state from families making less than 200 percent of the poverty level have been enrolled either in Schip or Medicaid. The letter sent to state officials was signed by Dennis G. Smith. 

Living people
Year of birth missing (living people)
Place of birth missing (living people)